David Woodard (born April 6, 1964) is an American conductor and writer. During the 1990s he coined the term prequiem, a portmanteau of preemptive and requiem, to describe his Buddhist practice of composing dedicated music to be rendered during or slightly before the death of its subject.

Los Angeles memorial services at which Woodard has served as conductor or music director include a 2001 civic ceremony held at the Angels Flight funicular railway honoring mishap casualty Leon Praport and his injured widow Lola. He has conducted wildlife requiems, including for a California brown pelican on the berm crest of a beach where the animal had fallen. He is reputed to favor colored inks in preparing a score.

Timothy McVeigh asked Woodard to conduct a prequiem Mass on the eve of his execution in Terre Haute, Indiana. Acknowledging McVeigh's "horrible deed", yet intending to provide comfort, Woodard consented by premiering the coda section of his composition "Ave Atque Vale" with a local brass choir at St. Margaret Mary Church, near USP Terre Haute, before an audience that included the following morning's witnesses. Archbishop Daniel M. Buechlein and later Cardinal Roger Mahony petitioned Pope John Paul II to bless Woodard's full score.

Woodard's replicas of the Dreamachine, a mildly psychoactive lamp, have been exhibited in art museums throughout the world. His contributions to literary journals such as Der Freund include writings on interspecies karma, plant consciousness and the Paraguayan settlement Nueva Germania.

Education
Woodard was educated privately and at The New School for Social Research.

Nueva Germania
In 2003 Woodard was elected councilman in Juniper Hills (Los Angeles County), California. In this capacity he proposed a sister city relationship with Nueva Germania, Paraguay. To advance his plan, Woodard traveled to the erstwhile vegetarian/feminist utopia and met with its municipal leadership. Following an initial visit, having encountered a population "in moral and intellectual decline", he chose not to pursue the relationship but had found in the community an object of study for later writings. What particularly interests him are the proto-transhumanist ideas of speculative planner Richard Wagner and Elisabeth Förster-Nietzsche, who along with her husband Bernhard Förster founded and lived in the so-called colony between 1886 and 1889.

In 2004, acknowledging sustainable aspects of Nueva Germania's founding ideals, Woodard composed the choral anthem "Our Jungle Holy Land".

From 2004 to 2006 Woodard led numerous expeditions to Nueva Germania, winning support from then U.S. Vice President Dick Cheney. In 2011 Woodard granted Swiss writer Christian Kracht license to publish some of their private correspondence, largely concerning Nueva Germania, under University of Hanover imprint Wehrhahn Verlag. Of the correspondence FAZ relates, "[The authors] obliterate the boundary between life and art." Der Spiegel posits that Five Years constitutes "the spiritual preparatory work" of Kracht's subsequent novel Imperium.

According to Andrew McCann, Woodard embarked on "a trip to what is left of the place, where descendants of original settlers live under drastically reduced circumstances" and was moved to "advance the cultural profile of the community, and to build a miniature Bayreuth opera house on the site of what was once Elisabeth Förster-Nietzsche's family residence." In recent years Nueva Germania has tempered into a more genial destination, with bed and breakfasts and a makeshift historical museum.

Dreamachine
From 1989 to 2007 Woodard built replicas of the Dreamachine, a stroboscopic device created by Brion Gysin and Ian Sommerville, involving a slotted cylinder made of copper or paper encircling an electric lamp on a motorized base constructed of cocobolo or pine. Woodard maintained that, observed with closed eyes, the machine could trigger mental states comparable to substance intoxication or dreaming.

Agreeing to contribute a Dreamachine to William S. Burroughs' 1996 LACMA visual retrospective Ports of Entry, Woodard also befriended the elderly author and presented him with a paper and pine "Bohemian model" Dreamachine on the occasion of his 83rd and final birthday. Sotheby's auctioned the former machine to a private collector in 2002, and the latter machine remains on extended loan from Burroughs' estate to the Spencer Museum of Art in Lawrence, Kansas. In a 2019 critical study, Beat scholar Raj Chandarlapaty re-evaluates Woodard's "idea-shattering" approach to the near-forgotten Dreamachine.

References

Notes

Citations

External links

1964 births
Musicians from Santa Barbara, California
Postmodern writers
Writers from Santa Barbara, California
American male composers
21st-century American composers
Living people
American Mennonites
American male writers
American male conductors (music)
American people of English descent
American people of German descent
The New School alumni
21st-century American conductors (music)
21st-century American male musicians